Zimbabwe has been competing at the Paralympic Games since the country became independent in 1980; it had previously competed as Rhodesia. Zimbabwe was absent from the Games in 1988 and 1992, returning in 1996 with a two-man delegation, and has competed at every edition of the Summer Paralympics since then. It has never taken part in the Winter Paralympics.

Zimbabweans have won a total of 2 gold medals, 9 silver, and 6 bronze. The country's most successful year, by far, was 1980, when Zimbabweans won 8 silver medals and 4 bronze - all but two won by Sandra James and Eileen Robertson, across events in several sports. Zimbabwe's first gold medal was won by Elliot Mujaji in 2000, in the 100m sprint (T46 category).  Mujaji won Zimbabwe's second (and most recent) Paralympic gold medal in the same event four years later. Zimbabwe have since failed to win any medals after 2004.

The Zimbabwe National Paralympic Committee was only officially launched and registered in 2010. Prior to this, "the government provided financial aid during the Paralympic Games, [but] there was no co-ordinated mechanism to maintain athletes' momentum between the Games", and athletes "had to find their own sponsor, coach and manager who would finance the training, travelling and their participation at competitions".

Medals by Summer Games

Medalists

See also
 Rhodesia at the Paralympics
 Zimbabwe at the Olympics

References